Hove is a constituent part of the City of Brighton & Hove in East Sussex, England. It may also refer to:

People
 Chenjerai Hove (1956–2015), Zimbabwean writer
 Fred Van Hove (1937–2022), Belgian jazz musician and a pioneer of European free jazz
 Ivo van Hove (born 1958), Belgian theatre director
 Joachim van den Hove (1567?–1620), Flemish composer
 Léon Van Hove (1924–1990), Belgian physicist
 Martin van den Hove (1605–1639), Dutch astronomer
 Peter van Hove (died 1793), Flemish theologian
 Tinashe Hove (born 1984), Zimbabwean cricketer

Places
 Hove (UK Parliament constituency)
 Hove railway station, Hove, England
 Hove, Belgium, a municipality in Belgium
 Hove, Germany, a locality of Jork
 Hove, South Australia, a suburb in Adelaide, Australia
 Hove railway station, Adelaide
 Hawaiian Ocean View Estates, Hawaii, (HOVE) a real estate development on Hawaii Island now known as Ocean View, Hawaii
 Høve, a village in northwest Zealand

Other uses
 Brighton & Hove Albion, an association football club in Brighton & Hove, England
 Hove Festival, a music festival in Norway
 Hove, past tense of heave

See also
 Hove Mobile Park, North Dakota, a former city in the United States with two residents